Joe Woodley is an American football coach. He is the head football coach at Grand View University in Des Moines, Iowa, a position he has held since the 2019 season. Woodley was an assistant coach at Grand View from 2008 to 2018 under his father, Mike Woodley, who was the first head coach for the program. The younger Woodley played college football as a linebacker at Iowa State University and was co-captain of the 2003 Iowa State Cyclones football team.

Head coaching record

References

External links
 Grand View profile

Year of birth missing (living people)
Living people
Grand View Vikings football coaches
Iowa State Cyclones football coaches
St. Ambrose Fighting Bees football coaches
High school football coaches in Iowa
People from West Des Moines, Iowa
Coaches of American football from Iowa
Players of American football from Iowa